The Lorenzo Natali Media Prize is a journalism prize awarded annually by the European Commission's Directorate-General for International Partnerships (DG INTPA) since 1992. The prize rewards outstanding reporting on themes including inequality, poverty eradication, sustainable development, peace, democracy and human rights.

History
Named after Lorenzo Natali, an Italian politician and former European Commissioner, the Lorenzo Natali Media Prize was established in 1992 to celebrate the work of journalists who report on stories about the social, political, economic and environmental dimensions of development around the world. It recognises journalism’s contribution to building more sustainable, fairer and more prosperous societies, in line with the European Union’s development policies.

The Prize was not awarded between 1995 and 1997. In 1998 the prize was relaunched in collaboration with the International Federation of Journalists who was a partner in managing the award for several years.

Entry criteria
The Lorenzo Natali Media Prize accepts published work from print, online and broadcast reporters from European Union countries as well as the EU's 158 international partner countries. Since 2019, journalists can enter in one of three categories: the Europe Prize for work published in an EU country; the Grand Prize for work published in an EU partner country; and the Best Emerging Journalist Prize, open to journalists under 30 publishing in an EU or partner country.

Selection of winners
Prize applications are pre-selected by four renowned international journalism faculties. During the 2022 edition of the prize, following universities were in charge of selection: Vesalius College, Belgium, the Catholic University of Portugal, Universidad de Navarra, Spain, and Université Saint-Joseph de Beyrouth, Lebanon. Pre-selected entries are then evaluated by a Grand Jury of renowned voices in journalism from around the world. The winner from each category is awarded EUR 10,000 and the winner of the Best Emerging Journalist Prize is offered a work experience opportunity with a European media partner of their choice.

The Grand Jury of the 2022 Lorenzo Natali Media Prize included Hannah Ajakaiye, Maria Ângela Carrascalão, Dr. Michael Rediske, Laurent Richard and Omaya Sosa.

Past winners
The first edition in 1992 was won by Reporters Without Borders. Since then, more than 100 published reports have been celebrated for their contribution to society across several categories. Journalists celebrated by the prize include:

 Octave Nicoué Broohm (1993)
 Charles Onyago Obbo (1993)
 Palagummi Sainath (1994)
 Michela Wrong (1998)
 Lucy Johnston (1998)
 Fariha Razzaq Haroon (1999)
 Mauri Köning (2002 and 2006)
 Mark Doyle and Ed Butler (2010)

On the 30th anniversary of the prize in 2022, the winners were:
 Europe Prize: Vânia Maia for ‘A journey into the world of exploited and invisible immigrants’, published in Visão.
 Grand Prize: Ritwika Mitra for ‘In the Sundarban, Climate Change Has an Unlikely Effect – On Child Trafficking’, published in The Wire (India) in partnership with the Fuller Project. 
 Best Emerging Journalist Prize: Rémi Carton and Paul Boyer for ‘In Haiti, ‘the shattered lives’ of child slave’s, published in Libération.

References

External links
 Official website
 Full list of eligible countries of the Lorenzo Natali Prize 2022
 Natali Prize 2022 Rules



Journalism awards